Storm in the Heartland is the third studio album by American country music artist Billy Ray Cyrus. Released in 1994 on Mercury Records, it produced the singles "Storm in the Heartland", "Deja Blue", and "One Last Thrill", the first two of which entered the Hot Country Singles & Tracks (now Hot Country Songs) charts. The album itself was certified gold by the RIAA for sales of over 500,000 copies.

"Only God (Could Stop Me Loving You)" was recorded in 1998 by Lari White as a duet with Toby Keith on White's album Stepping Stone, and again in 2002 by the Canadian country band Emerson Drive on their self-titled album. Emerson Drive's rendition was released as a single in 2003.

Critical reception

Stephen Thomas Erlewine of Allmusic rated the album three stars out of five, saying that he considered it an improvement over It Won't Be the Last. Chris Dickinson of New Country magazine gave it 2 out of 5. He wrote that "On Storm in the Heartland, Cyrus kept the pop, the rock, the bombast, and the bluster, but tossed out the memorable hooks." He thought that the album lacked personality and had "cluttered" production, but praised "A Heart with Your Name on It" and "Roll Me Over" as "fun", and "Patsy Come Home" as "sentimental but moving." Giving it a "C", Alanna Nash of Entertainment Weekly wrote that Cyrus "sticks to the tried-and-true" but added that "the yahoo factor figures heavily on 'Redneck Heaven'[…]and on 'The Past,' Cyrus misses his notes by a mile. An achy-breaky embarrassment."

Track listing
"Storm in the Heartland" (Billy Henderson, Donald Burns, Curt Ryle) — 3:53
"Deja Blue" (Craig Wiseman, Donny Lowery) — 3:36
"Redneck Heaven" (Billy Ray Cyrus, Terry Shelton, Michael Joe Sagraves, Mark Collie, Danny Shirley) — 4:03
featuring Mark Collie and Danny Shirley
"Casualty of Love" (Cyrus, Don Von Tress) — 4:29
"One Last Thrill" (Dave Loggins, Reed Nielsen) — 3:38
"I Ain't Even Left" (Cyrus, Corky Holbrook, Joe Scaife) — 3:51
"How Much" (Gregg Sutton, Danny Tate) — 5:30
"Patsy Come Home" (Ronnie Scaife, Katie Wallace) — 3:53
"A Heart with Your Name on It" (Brett Beavers, Phillip Douglas) — 2:44
"Only God Could Stop Me Loving You" (Robert John "Mutt" Lange) — 5:10
"Roll Me Over" (Cyrus, Barton Stevens, Greg Fletcher, Shelton, Holbrook, Sagraves) — 2:33
"Enough Is Enough" (Cyrus, Von Tress, Keith Hinton) — 3:43
"The Past" (Cyrus) — 4:06
"Geronimo" (Cyrus, Von Tress, Hinton) — 3:51

Chart performance

Weekly charts

Year-end charts

Singles

Personnel
As listed in the album's liner notes.

Sly Dog
 Billy Ray Cyrus - lead vocals, rhythm guitar
 Greg Fletcher - drums, percussion, background vocals
 Corky Holbrook - bass, background vocals
 Michael J. Sagraves - acoustic guitar, electric guitar, steel, harmonica, harp, slide guitar, background vocals
 Terry Shelton - lead guitar, background vocals
 Barton Stevens - keyboards, background vocals

Additional musicians
 Eddie Bayers - drums
 Mike Brignardello - bass guitar
 Clyde "Butch" Carr - tambourine, background vocals
 Mark Collie - background vocals on "Redneck Heaven"
 Jim Cotton - Indian chants on "Geronimo"
 Dan Dugmore - steel guitar, lap steel guitar, Dobro
 Sonny Garrish - Dobro
 Keith Hinton - acoustic guitar, electric guitar, Indian chants on "Geronimo"
 Mike Lawler - keyboards
 Dave Loggins - background vocals on "One Last Thrill"
 Gary Lunn - bass guitar
 Randy McCormick - keyboards
 The Oak Ridge Boys - background vocals on "I Ain't Even Left"
 Matt Rollings - piano
 Joe Scaife - background vocals
 Ronny Scaife - acoustic guitar, background vocals
 Danny Shirley - background vocals on "Redneck Heaven"
 Joe Shirley - background vocals
 Don Von Trees - acoustic guitar, electric guitar, background vocals
 Billy Joe Walker Jr. - acoustic guitar
 Reggie Young - electric guitar

Certifications

References

1994 albums
Billy Ray Cyrus albums
Mercury Nashville albums